Sir Paul Edward Pieris Deraniyagala Samarasinha Sriwardhana,  (February 16, 1874 – 1959) (commonly known as Sir Paul E. Pieris) was a Ceylonese civil servant and historian. He served as Ceylon's Trade Commissioner and a District Judge and held multiple appointments as president of the Royal Asiatic Society of Sri Lanka. Although his academic and early career was in the legal field, he is best known for being one of the country's foremost experts on the history of European occupation of Sri Lanka.

Early life and education

Born to John Martinus Pieris Sriwardhana and Don Johannes Dias Bandaranaike, Pieris was educated at S. Thomas' College, Mutwal and in 1889 was judged the most successful candidate at the Cambridge Local Junior Examination in the under-sixteen group, passing out in the first division with distinctions in English, Latin, Greek, Mathematics, Botany, and Drawing. In 1890, he repeated his former success with distinctions in several subjects, including Religious Knowledge, and in the following year, again, with five distinctions. He then became the first Asian to be admitted to Trinity College, Cambridge, and after a distinguished performance as an undergraduate he was admitted as a barrister of the Inner Temple in 1895. Having passed the Civil Service exam in London, on his return to Ceylon, Pieiris was enrolled as an advocate of the Supreme Court of Ceylon and joined the Ceylon Civil Service.

Civil service career

In 1896, he was select to the Ceylon Civil Service and served until his retirement in 1935. During this time he had served mostly as a District Judge in the towns of Matara, Kegalle, Kandy and Kalutara. During his tenure as District Judge of Kandy, in 1914 he preceded over the Gampola Perahera Case filled by a Basnayake Nilame. Pieris's judgement was referred to the Supreme Court of Ceylon by the Attorney General and was set-aside eventually leading to the 1915 riots. He served as Trade Commissioner for Ceylon in Britain and thereafter appointed the first Public Trustee of Ceylon, from which he retired.

Scholarly work

It has been remarked that Pieris was never given a position in the Civil Service that was commensurate with his intellect and ability, and as such he turned his attention toward in depth historical research on the European occupation in Ceylon from the 16th Century onwards. Pieris carried out extensive historical research in Ceylon and he was several times elected the president of the Royal Asiatic Society of Ceylon having last held the role from 1932 to 1934. to whose journal he contributed frequently from 1904 to 1948. He further single-handedly edited the journal during the years of World War II when the society's functions were greatly disrupted by external factors.

Notable publications

 Notes on some Sinhalese Families in Ceylon (in 6 volumes from 1902 onwards)
 Ceylon: The Portuguese Era (1913),  II volumes, 1250 pp.
 Ceylon and the Portuguese, 1505-1658 (assisted by R.B. Naish), 310 pp (1920).
 Ceylon and the Hollanders, 1658-1796 (1918)
 The Kingdom of Jafanapatam, 1645. From the Portuguese Foral. (1920)
 Portuguese Maps and Plans of Ceylon, 1650 (1926)
 The Prince Vijayapala of Ceylon, 1634-1654 (1927), 66 pp.
 The Historic Tragedy of Ceilao, by Captain Joao Ribeiro, tr. 306 pp.
 The Growth of Dutch Influence in Ceylon, 1602-1660, 326 pp.
 The Dutch Power in Ceylon, 1602–1670. Edited by P. E. Pieris. 1929 
 Ceylon and Portugal: Kings and Christians, 1539 - 1552. From the archives at Lisbon, P.E. Pieris and M.A.H. Fitzler (1927)
 Portugal in Ceylon: Lectures at Kings College, London
 Letters to Ceylon, 1814-1824: Correspondence of Sir John D'Oyly 155pp.
 Tri Sinhala, the Last Phase, 1796–1815 (1945)
 The Ceylon Littoral, 1593 (1949) 88pp.
 Sinhalē and the Patriots, 1815–1818 (1950)

Honours and awards

Pieris received numerous awards during his life time. These include;
 The first Asian to receive a Doctor of Letters from the University of Cambridge
 King's Birthday Honours 1933 - Companion of the Order of St Michael and St George (CMG) for service as Public Trustee
 The Royal Asiatic Society Medal for distinguished service in 1946
 Queen's Birthday Honours 1952 - Knight Bachelor for social service.

Personal life

He married Hilda Obeyesekere, daughter of James Peter Obeyesekere I. Lady Hilda Obeyesekere Pieris, was an active social worker, who endowed the Hilda Obeysekera Hall, the ladies residency hall at the University of Peradeniya. His brothers-in-law included Donald Obeyesekere and Sir James Peter Obeyesekere II. They had three sons, the zoologist Paules Edward Pieris Deraniyagala; the painter, Justin Pieris Deraniyagala; civil servant Ralph St. Louis Pieris Deraniyagala and one daughter Miriam Pieris Deraniyagala, herself an artist, who married Robert de Saram. Sri Lankan cellist Rohan de Saram is their grandson. Following their retirement from the civil service, Sir Paul Pieris and Lady Obeyesekere Pieris, built the Nugedola Wallauwa in Pasyala, Gampaha District, where they spent their retirement.

References

1874 births
1955 deaths
Sinhalese civil servants
Sinhalese lawyers
Sri Lankan barristers
Alumni of S. Thomas' College, Mount Lavinia
Alumni of Trinity College, Cambridge
Members of the Inner Temple
Ceylonese Knights Bachelor
Ceylonese Companions of the Order of St Michael and St George